Hoem is a Norwegian surname. Notable people with this surname include:

 Bjørn Tore Hoem (born 1991), Norwegian cyclist
 Edvard Hoem (born 1949), Norwegian novelist
 Gottfred Hoem (1900–1979), Norwegian politician
 Ine Hoem (born 1985), Norwegian singer
 Jan Hoem (1939–2017), Norwegian scientist
 Knut Hoem (1924–1987), Norwegian politician